The 2012 Natomas Men's Professional Tennis Tournament was a professional tennis tournament played on hard courts. It was the eighth edition of the tournament which was part of the 2012 ATP Challenger Tour. It took place in Sacramento, United States between 1 and 7 October 2012.

Singles main-draw entrants

Seeds

 1 Rankings are as of September 24, 2012.

Other entrants
The following players received wildcards into the singles main draw:
  James Blake
  Bradley Klahn
  Daniel Kosakowski
  Frederik Nielsen

The following players received entry from the qualifying draw:
  Taro Daniel
  Luka Gregorc
  Greg Jones
  Phillip Simmonds

Champions

Singles

 James Blake def.  Mischa Zverev, 6–1, 1–6, 6–4

Doubles

 Tennys Sandgren /  Rhyne Williams def.  Devin Britton /  Austin Krajicek, 4–6, 6–4, [12–10]

External links
Official Website

 
Natomas Men's Professional Tennis Tournament
Natomas Men's Professional Tennis Tournament
Natomas Men's Professional Tennis Tournament